"Let It Die" is the fourth single from the Foo Fighters' sixth album, Echoes, Silence, Patience & Grace. It was only released as a promotional single in 2007 and no physical retail single was released. It was, however, available commercially as a digital downloadable single.

Track listing
The single has currently only been released as an iTunes exclusive digital download, listed as a digital EP.
All songs by Foo Fighters, except where noted.

"Let It Die" – 4:05
"Keep the Car Running" (Arcade Fire cover) – 3:25
"If Ever" – 4:14
"Come Alive" (demo version) – 5:30

Meaning
The song's meaning was hinted in a Canadian Television interview. It was mentioned that it was about personal fights between people, and those people breaking apart, and that the fights are meaningless overall. Further speculation leads to Grohl's forbearance between Courtney Love, and Kurt Cobain (Grohl's former bandmate from Nirvana and Love's husband)'s relationship, drug use, and financial arrangements. Grohl indirectly admitted to the song being about Courtney Love in an interview in 2007.

Live performances
The song was a staple on the Echoes, Silence, Patience, and Grace tour. It was also played often on the Wasting Light tour but was dropped in 2012. It was not played again until the Concrete and Gold tour in 2017, where it has been played occasionally.

Personnel
 Dave Grohl – lead vocals, rhythm guitar
 Chris Shiflett – lead guitar
 Nate Mendel – bass
 Taylor Hawkins – drums
 Pat Smear - additional rhythm guitar

Chart positions

Weekly charts

Year-end charts

References

2008 singles
Foo Fighters songs
Songs written by Dave Grohl
Song recordings produced by Gil Norton
2007 songs
RCA Records singles
Songs written by Taylor Hawkins
Songs written by Nate Mendel
Songs written by Chris Shiflett